Sunny Mehta (born April 7, 1978, in Grand Rapids, Michigan) is an American hockey executive, data scientist, and former professional poker player, writer, options trader, and musician. Currently the Vice President of Hockey Strategy and Intelligence for the Florida Panthers, he pioneered the first full-time analytics department in the National Hockey League as Director of Hockey Analytics for the New Jersey Devils. He is co-author of two bestselling poker strategy books.

Biography 
Mehta grew up in Wyckoff, New Jersey, and graduated from Ramapo High School, where he played varsity ice hockey. He studied Jazz Guitar and Studio Music at the University of Miami Frost School of Music, and then moved to New Orleans, Louisiana to perform and record with various local acts. He later worked as a derivatives trader at the Chicago Board of Trade, and received a Master's in Data Science from the City University of New York.

Career

Poker 
Mehta began playing poker as a hobby in 2003, and by 2004 was playing professionally in high-stakes no-limit Texas hold 'em games. After moving to Las Vegas, Nevada in 2005 in the wake of Hurricane Katrina, he met poker author Ed Miller and publisher Mason Malmuth. Mehta and Miller, along with poker player Matt Flynn, co-authored "Professional No-Limit Hold 'em: Volume I", which was released by Malmuth's Two Plus Two Publishing in 2007. The book immediately became the #1 gambling and poker book on Amazon's bestseller list.

The author team of Mehta, Miller, and Flynn left Two Plus Two to self-publish their highly anticipated second book, "Small Stakes No-Limit Hold'em", which was released in 2009.

Hockey 
Mehta went on to do statistical analysis of National Hockey League hockey games, and he published articles about it. He was hired by the New Jersey Devils in 2014 to serve as Director of Hockey Analytics and start the first full-time analytics department in the NHL. He has additionally consulted for the Phoenix Coyotes and Washington Capitals, as well as six Major League Baseball teams.

Mehta was hired by the Florida Panthers in 2020 as Vice President of Hockey Strategy and Intelligence.

Accomplishments 
 
 
 
 
 13th place in the 2006 World Poker Open $1,500 Buy-In No-Limit Hold 'em Event

References

External links
Sunny Mehta Official Site
Small Stakes No-Limit Hold'em Official Site

1978 births
American gambling writers
American male writers of Indian descent
American poker players
Living people
People from Wyckoff, New Jersey
Ramapo High School (New Jersey) alumni
University of Miami Frost School of Music alumni
American male non-fiction writers